Dalatias is a genus of kitefin sharks that have lived since the Middle Eocene. It was thought to be a monotypic taxon with the type species, D. licha, considered as the only species until 2022, when Malyshkina and her colleagues described a new Middle Miocene species, D. orientalis. D. orientalis is discovered from the Duho Formation in Pohang, South Korea.

References

Shark genera
Taxa named by Constantine Samuel Rafinesque
Dalatiidae